Marianne Josephine Zoff (30 June 1893 – 22 November 1984) was an Austrian actress and opera singer (mezzo-soprano).

Zoff was born in Hainfeld, Lower Austria. Starting in 1919 at the Staatstheater Augsburg, she sang at several German opera house until 1925 at the Theater Münster.

Zoff was the first wife of Bertolt Brecht, to whom she was married from 1922 until September 1927. Their daughter Hanne Marianne was born on 12 March 1923. The writer Otto Zoff was her older brother.

In 1928 Zoff married the actor Theo Lingen and Zoff's daughter Hanne grew up with her and Lingen. Lingen's popularity protected Zoff and her daughter, who were classified as half-Jews by the Nazi regime, from persecution. In 1928, Zoff and Lingen had a daughter, Ursula Lingen, who also was an actress.

Zoff died in 1984, aged 91, in Vienna and is buried at the Vienna Zentralfriedhof.

Literature

References

1893 births
1984 deaths
Austrian operatic mezzo-sopranos
20th-century Austrian women opera singers
Austrian stage actresses
Austrian Jews
Burials at the Vienna Central Cemetery
Family of Bertolt Brecht
Lingen family
People from Lilienfeld District